is a masculine vocaloid character produced by AH-Software Co. Ltd and released originally for Vocaloid 2.  His voice is provided by Japanese male singer Kiyoshi Hiyama.

Development
He was released on the same day as Kaai Yuki and SF-A2 Miki with Kaai Yuki and he being released as "student" and "teacher" vocals.  The voice who had been sampled for him had been secret for a time, however, Kiyoshi himself announced it on Nico Nico Live on August 12, 2010.

His vocals were one of the Vocaloid 2 male vocals which was used in reference to the creation of VY2.

Additional software
Silhouettes for the AH-Software Vocaloid 2 vocals were revealed on a poster on November 6, 2014; however, it was unconfirmed what they were for at the time. On November 20, it was confirmed in the livestream for Vocaloid 4 that they all, with the exception of Tohoku Zunko, would receive updated vocals for the new engine.  Kiyoteru's new vocals were recorded from scratch to improve his upper and lower ranges. Kiyoteru was confirmed to receive a "Natural" and "Rock" vocal for his Vocaloid release, allowing him to make use of the cross-synthesis feature in Vocaloid 4.

In an interview, Tomohide Ogata expressed a desire to produce English versions of their Vocals, however, the project is too complex.  He went on to explain that because all of their providers are Japanese, they would rather seek English speakers of a similar voice to the Japanese versions from the United States and United Kingdom.

Characteristics
Kiyoteru's tie clip is a motif of YAMAHA's electric upright bass SLB100 and his glasses are ZS92001A by Zoff.

Kiyoteru is a teacher who participates in a rock band called Ice Mountain on weekends, with the stage name "Ice Mountain Teru." He is also said to be good at mathematics.  "Ice Mountain" were featured in a book of the same name, and all members were given biography details in relation to this. According to the book, the default configuration for his software package happens to be Kiyoteru's vocals as a rookie singer.

See also
 List of Vocaloid products

References

Vocaloids introduced in 2009
Fictional singers
Japanese idols
Japanese popular culture